Tengchow may refer to the following cities in Shandong (Shantung), China:
Penglai, formerly known as 'Dengzhou' in Chinese
Tengzhou